Kannula Kaasa Kaattappa ( Show me the money) is a 2016 Indian Tamil-language drama film written and directed by Gowtham Sundararajan. It features Aravind Akash, Chandini Tamilarasan and Ashwathy Warrier in the leading roles. The film released on 25 November 2016.

Plot 
A minister of government tries to stash his illegal money in an offshore bank account through a hawala broker, meanwhile, a number of petty thieves in Malaysia plan to steal that cash.

Cast 

Aravind Akash as Jai
M. S. Bhaskar as Chinnapaiyan
Yogi Babu as Kettavan
Chandini Tamilarasan as Shaalu
Ashwathy Warrier as Madhurima
Kalyan as Don
Vichu Vishwanath as Jack
Gowtham Sundararajan
Kavithalaya Krishnan
Balaji Mohan
Sugar Vel as James Pandey
Kedhu Murthy as Minister Alangaaramurthy
P. A. Anand as Allakai Anand

Soundtrack 
The songs were made by Divakar Subramaniam.

"Naan Nee" - Anugraha Sridhar
"Dhuddu Thandhaane"  - Anugraha Sridhar, M. J. Shriram
 "Mannasukkule" - M. J. Shriram
 "Naai Vaalu Nimirumaa" - Divakar Subramaniam

Production 
The film began production in August 2015, with actor Gowtham Sundararajan making his directorial debut and finalising the project after a year of script-writing.

Release and reception
The film opened to mixed reviews during November 2016, with a critic from The Times of India noting the "filmmaking lacks the zaniness that such a screwball premise requires and the TV serial-like visuals take some time getting used to", suggesting that "the pacing, too, feels slow for a film that is basically one madcap chase". The New Indian Express gave the film a more positive review suggesting that "what is laudable is that Goutham has moved away from the routine formula track and cliches" and "what is also appreciable is that he stayed focused on his theme and was not distracted by unwanted elements like fights and comedy tracks".

References

External links 
 

2016 films
2010s Tamil-language films
2016 directorial debut films